Barry Doyle Harris (December 15, 1929 – December 8, 2021) was an American jazz pianist, bandleader, composer, arranger, and educator. He was an exponent of the bebop style.

Life and career

Harris was born in Detroit, Michigan, on December 15, 1929, to Melvin Harris and Bessie as the fourth of their five children. Harris took piano lessons from his mother at the age of four. His mother, a church pianist, asked him if he was interested in playing church music or jazz. Having picked the latter, he was influenced by Thelonious Monk and Bud Powell. In his teens, he learned bebop largely by ear, imitating solos by Powell. He described Powell's style as being the "epitome" of jazz. He performed for dances in clubs and ballrooms. He was based in Detroit through the 1950s and worked with Miles Davis, Sonny Stitt, and Thad Jones, and substituted for Junior Mance in the Gene Ammons band. In 1956, he toured briefly with Max Roach, after Richie Powell, the band's pianist and younger brother of Bud Powell, died in a car crash.

Harris performed with Cannonball Adderley's quintet and on television with them. After moving to New York City, he worked as an educator and performed with Dexter Gordon, Illinois Jacquet, Yusef Lateef and Hank Mobley. Between 1965 and 1969, he worked extensively with Coleman Hawkins at the Village Vanguard.

During the 1970s, Harris lived with Monk at the Weehawken, New Jersey, home of the jazz patron Baroness Pannonica de Koenigswarter. He substituted for Monk in rehearsals at the New York Jazz Repertory Company in 1974.

In Japan, he performed at the Yubin Chokin concert hall in Tokyo over two days, and his performances were recorded and compiled into an album released by Xanadu Records. Between 1982 and 1987, he led the Jazz Cultural Workshop on 8th Avenue in New York.

From the 1990s onwards, Harris collaborated with Howard Rees on videos and workbooks documenting his harmonic and improvisational systems and teaching process. He held music workshop sessions in New York City for vocalists, students of piano and other instruments.

Harris appeared in the 1989 documentary film, Thelonious Monk: Straight, No Chaser (produced by Clint Eastwood's own production company), performing duets with Tommy Flanagan. In 2000, he was profiled in the film Barry Harris - Spirit of Bebop.

He continued his weekly workshops even during the COVID-19 pandemic, in an online format.

Harris died from complications of COVID-19 at a hospital in North Bergen, New Jersey, on December 8, 2021, seven days before his 92nd birthday.

Jazz Cultural Theatre

Larry Ridley, Barry Harris, Jim Harrison, and Frank Fuentes were partners in creating the Jazz Cultural Theatre beginning 1982. Located at 368 Eighth Avenue in New York City in a storefront between 28th and 29th Streets in Manhattan, it was primarily a performance venue featuring prominent jazz artists and also hosted jam sessions. Additionally, it was known for Harris's music classes for vocalists and instrumentalists, each taught in separate sessions. Several artists recorded albums at the club, including Barry on his For the Moment. Some of the many musicians and notable jazz figures who appeared at the Jazz Cultural Theatre were bassist Larry Ridley, guitarist Ted Dunbar, pianist Jack Wilson, trumpeter Bill Hardman, tenor saxophonist Junior Cook, trumpeter Tommy Turrentine, alto saxophonist Charles McPherson, pianist Mickey Tucker, guitarist Peter Leitch, tenor saxophonist Clifford Jordan, guitarist Mark Elf, alto saxophonist Lou Donaldson, drummer Leroy Williams, drummer Vernel Fournier, drummer Jimmy Lovelace, bassist Hal Dotson, bassist Jamil Nasser, pianist Chris Anderson, pianist Walter Davis, Jr., pianist Michael Weiss, tap dancers Lon Chaney and Jimmy Slyde, Francis Paudras (biographer of pianist Bud Powell), and Baroness Pannonica de Koenigswarter, who would park her silver Bentley sedan in front of the club.

Awards and honors
 2000 American Jazz Hall of Fame for Lifetime Achievements & Contributions to the World of Jazz
 1998 Lifetime Achievements Award for Contributions to the Music World from the National Association of Negro Musicians
 1998 Congratulatory Letter as a Jazz Musician and Educator by the U.S. White House
 1997 Dizzy Gillespie Achievement Award
 1997 Recognition of Excellence in Jazz Music and Education
 1995 Doctor of Arts - Honorary Degree by Northwestern University
 1995 Presidential Award, Recognition of Dedication and Commitment to the Pursuance of Artistic Excellence in Jazz Performance and Education
 1995 Honorary Jazz Award by the House of Representatives
 1989 NEA Jazz Master

Discography

As leader 

Source:

As sideman

With Cannonball Adderley
 Them Dirty Blues (Riverside, 1960)
With Joshua Breakstone
 Wonderful! (Sonora, 1984)
With Charlie Byrd
 Blues Sonata (Riverside, 1961)
With Donald Byrd
 Byrd Jazz (Transition, 1955) - also released as First Flight (Delmark)
With Al Cohn
 Play It Now (Xanadu, 1975)
 Al Cohn's America (Xanadu, 1976)
 No Problem (Xanadu, 1979)
With Sonny Criss
 Saturday Morning (Xanadu, 1975)
With Art Farmer and Donald Byrd
 2 Trumpets (Prestige, 1956)
With Dan Faulk
 Focusing In (Criss Cross Jazz, 1992)
With Terry Gibbs
 Bopstacle Course (Xanadu, 1974)
With Benny Golson
 The Other Side of Benny Golson (Riverside, 1958)
With Dexter Gordon
 Clubhouse (Blue Note, 1965 - released 1979)
 Gettin' Around (Blue Note, 1965)
 The Tower of Power! (Prestige, 1969)
 More Power! (Prestige, 1969)
 True Blue with Al Cohn (Xanadu, 1976)
 Silver Blue with Al Cohn (Xanadu, 1976)
 Biting the Apple (SteepleChase, 1976)
With Johnny Griffin
 White Gardenia (Riverside, 1961)
 The Kerry Dancers (Riverside, 1961–62)
With Coleman Hawkins
 Wrapped Tight (Impulse!, 1965)
Sirius (Pablo, 1966 [1974])
With Louis Hayes
 Louis Hayes (Vee-Jay, 1960)
With Jimmy Heath
 Picture of Heath (Xanadu, 1975)
With Buck Hill
Capital Hill (Muse, 1990)
The Buck Stops Here (Muse, 1992)
With Illinois Jacquet
 Bottoms Up (Prestige, 1968)
With Eddie Jefferson
Body and Soul (Prestige, 1968)
With Carmell Jones
 Jay Hawk Talk (Prestige, 1965)
With Thad Jones
 The Magnificent Thad Jones (Blue Note, 1956)
With Sam Jones
 Cello Again (Xanadu, 1975)
 Changes & Things (Xanadu, 1977)
With Clifford Jordan
 Repetition (Soul Note, 1984)
 
With Lee Konitz
 Lullaby of Birdland (Candid, 1991 [1994])
With Harold Land
 West Coast Blues! (Jazzland, 1960)
With Yusef Lateef
 Eastern Sounds (Moodsville, 1960)
 Into Something (New Jazz, 1961)
 Suite 16 (Atlantic, 1970)
With Warne Marsh
 Back Home (Criss Cross Jazz, 1986)
With Earl May
 Swinging the Blues (Arbors, 2005)
With Charles McPherson
 Bebop Revisited! (Prestige, 1964)
 Con Alma! (Prestige, 1965)
 The Quintet/Live! (Prestige, 1966)
 McPherson's Mood (Prestige, 1969)
 Charles McPherson (Mainstream, 1971)
 Siku Ya Bibi (Day of the Lady) (Mainstream, 1972)
 Today's Man (Mainstream, 1973)
 Live in Tokyo (Xanadu, 1976)
With Billy Mitchell
 The Colossus of Detroit (Xanadu, 1978)
With Hank Mobley
 Mobley's Message (Prestige 1956)
 Jazz Message No. 2 (Savoy 1957)
 The Turnaround (Blue Note, 1965)
With James Moody
 Don't Look Away Now! (Prestige, 1969)
With Frank Morgan
You Must Believe in Spring (Antilles, 1992) 
With Lee Morgan
 Take Twelve (Jazzland, 1962)
 The Sidewinder (Blue Note, 1963)
With Sal Nistico
 Heavyweights (Jazzland, 1961)
With Dave Pike
 It's Time for Dave Pike (Riverside, 1961)
With Sonny Red
 Breezing (Jazzland, 1960)
 The Mode (Jazzland (1961)
 Images (Jazzland, 1961)
With Red Rodney
 Bird Lives! (Muse, 1973)
 Home Free (Muse, 1977 [1979])
With Jack Sheldon
Playing for Change (Uptown, 1986 [1997])
With Sonny Stitt
 Burnin' (Argo, 1958)
 Tune-Up! (Cobblestone, 1972)
 Constellation (Cobblestone, 1972)
 12! (Muse, 1972)
 My Buddy: Sonny Stitt Plays for Gene Ammons (Muse, 1975)
 Blues for Duke (Muse, 1975 [1978])
In Style (Muse, 1982)
With Don Wilkerson
 The Texas Twister (Riverside, 1960)

See also
Bebop scale, one of the education tools in jazz that Harris pioneered

References

External links 
Barry Harris Official Website
Jazzworkshops Website -- publisher of Barry Harris workbooks and instructional videos
 
 
 
Artist Profile: Barry Harris at WBGO
Transcription of Barry Harris Music

1929 births
2021 deaths
American jazz pianists
American male pianists
Bebop pianists
Hard bop pianists
Mainstream jazz pianists
Place of birth missing
Musicians from Detroit
People from Weehawken, New Jersey
Xanadu Records artists
Prestige Records artists
Riverside Records artists
American jazz educators
20th-century American pianists
Jazz musicians from Michigan
Educators from New Jersey
Educators from Michigan
21st-century American pianists
20th-century American male musicians
21st-century American male musicians
American male jazz musicians
Cannonball Adderley Quintet members
Nagel-Heyer Records artists
Reservoir Records artists
Concord Records artists
Deaths from the COVID-19 pandemic in New Jersey
Argo Records artists